Westella is a genus of green algae in the family Oocystaceae.

References

Trebouxiophyceae genera
Chlorellales